Klaus Stürmer (9 August 1935 – 1 June 1971) was a German football player. He represented Germany on two occasions, including a 1962 FIFA World Cup qualifier against Northern Ireland. On his debut on 16 October 1954 against France he became the youngest player of the post-war era to score for Germany at age 19 years 68 days, a record that was equalled in 2011 by Mario Götze

Honours
 DFB-Pokal finalist: 1956.
 German champion: 1960.
 Swiss Super League champion: 1963, 1966.
 Swiss Cup winner: 1966.

External links
 
 Stats Klaus Stürmer 

1935 births
1971 deaths
German footballers
Germany international footballers
Hamburger SV players
FC Zürich players
FC Grenchen players
SC Young Fellows Juventus players
Association football forwards
People from Stormarn (district)
Footballers from Schleswig-Holstein
West German expatriate sportspeople in Switzerland
West German footballers
West German expatriate footballers
Expatriate footballers in Switzerland